Colegio Nacional de Arquitectos de Cuba (C.N.A.C.) is a Cuban national institution based in Havana, that grew out of El Colegio de Arquitectos de La Habana.

History

Founding
It was founded in Havana on March 13, 1916. Established by legislation, the compulsory licensing of these professionals and the Provincial Colleges of Architects were founded, giving way in 1933 to the constitution of the National College of Architects of Cuba.

Legal
On April 5, 1916, at a meeting held at Tacón Street No. 2, with the presence of the architects Gabriel Román Casals, Rogelio Santana Fernández, Jorge Broderman de Vignier and Lorenzo Rodríguez Ubals, the following minutes were drawn up:

Architecture 

The circulation of the Colegio Nacional de Arquitectos building is through a double-loaded corridor. It was one of the first curtain walls to be used in Cuba.  The building consists of a semi-basement and two floors that houses offices, a library, recreation rooms, an auditorium, and a large spiral staircase that forms a large space on three levels which is illuminated by natural light from three panels of glass blocks. It has several outdoor porches. On the outside, coral stone and green Cuban marble are used. The main part of the building (auditorium) is covered by a gable roof, the rest of the building has a flat roof.

Directors
In 1928 the board was formed by Esteban Rodríguez Castells who was the first vice president, Emilio de Soto, the second vice president, Miguel Ángel Moenck served as treasurer and Alberto Camacho was the librarian, artistic director of the magazine and member of the Legal and Advertising Commission.

Other members were the architects Joaquín Weiss, Enrique Luis Varela, Pedro Martínez Inclán and Pérez Benitoa, who was a member of the Foreign Affairs Committee.

Between 1950 and 1961, they occupied the presidency, Rene Echarte Mazorra, Pedro Guerra Seguí, Agustín Sorhegui Vázquez, Vicente J. Salles Burell, Horacio Navarrete Serrano and Rodulfo Ibarra Pérez.

Decree-Law No. 3174
The Colegio Nacional de Arquitectos de Cuba emerged as a result of Decree-Law No. 3174 of the Ministry of Public Works on December 13, 1933. The Colegio had six provincial headquarters throughout the country. The law established that all work built in the country should have the approval of the school. Segunda Zafra presents the list of architects who formed part of the National College of Architects of Cuba in 1940, its executive committee, its Provincial Colleges and its Honorary and Correspondent partners, both in Cuba and abroad. National College of Architects of Cuba (1916). As of December 31, 1958, there were 676 architects licensed and registered in the National College of which 590 were in the Provincial College of Havana.

In 1924, proposals were requested and the project was awarded to Architect César Guerra. In 1926 the building was finished, however soon thereafter it was discovered that the building was too small to include many of the required functions. In 1945 proposals were once again accepted for the enlargement of the existing building. The new building by architects Esquiroz and Zarraga resulted in a total reconstruction of the existing building.

Other organizations
In 1932 the Federation of Architects of Cuba was created, which grouped the professionals who began to practice outside of Havana, until the 1950s had about 90% of architects based in the capital.

Annual prize
1953, Tropicana Club, Max Borges Jr.  (1918-2009), Architect.
1956 gold medal by the School of Architects in Havana, Retiro Odontologico building, Antonio Quintana Simonetti (1919-1943), Architect.
1959, Edificio del Seguro Médico, Havana, Antonio Quintana Simonetti (1919-1943), Architect.

Gallery

See also 

Maternidad Obrera de Marianao
Tropicana Club
Max Borges Jr.
Antonio Quintana Simonetti
Edificio del Seguro Médico, Havana

Notes

References 

Havana

Art Deco architecture
Architecture in Havana
1926 architecture
Architecture groups
Architecture organizations
Buildings and structures completed in 1926
Buildings and structures in Havana
20th-century architecture in Cuba